Martin John Foyle (born 2 May 1963) is an English former professional footballer and manager who is the Head of Recruitment at  club St Mirren. In his 20-year playing career he played 533 League games, scoring 155 goals. As a manager, he took charge of Port Vale and York City, Northwich Victoria, Hereford United and Southport.

He started his career with Southampton as a trainee and after spending four years at the club, during which he was loaned out on two occasions, he joined Aldershot for a £10,000 fee in August 1984. An £140,000 move to Oxford United followed in March 1987, and he became Port Vale's record signing when they paid £375,000 for him in June 1991. He spent nine seasons at the club, where he scored 108 goals in 353 appearances. He was twice voted the club's Player of the Year and helped the Vale to win the Football League Trophy in 1993.

After retiring as a player, he managed Port Vale's youth team and in February 2004 took charge of first-team affairs, eventually leaving the club in September 2007 by mutual consent. A spell as caretaker manager at Wrexham preceded his appointment as manager of York City in November 2008. Foyle took York to an FA Trophy Final and Conference Premier play-off Final, but resigned in September 2010. He was put in charge of Northwich Victoria for a three-month spell in February 2012 before being appointed manager at Hereford United in May 2012. He stayed with Hereford until departing in March 2014. He was appointed as Southport manager in May 2014 but resigned five months later.

Playing career

Southampton

Foyle was born in Salisbury, Wiltshire, where he made his name in local football, before Football League referee Tony Glasson saw him playing for Bemerton Athletic and recommended him to Lawrie McMenemy, manager of Southampton. He joined Southampton as a trainee in 1980, signing as a professional on 13 August of that year. He had grown up supporting the club and would get to play alongside his idol, Mick Channon.

He spent the summer of 1982 from May to October playing on loan with Swedish Division 5 side IFK Munkfors, which helped his development, scoring 30 goals in 22 appearances as Munkfors were promoted for the first time since 1959. Shortly after his return to Southampton he made his first team debut on 15 January 1983 in a 1–1 draw at home to Coventry City.

On 25 October 1983, he came on as a second-half substitute for Ian Baird in a League Cup match at home to Carlisle United. His 86th-minute goal brought the tie level on aggregate and was followed by the winner in extra-time. In the next round, Foyle came on as a sixth-minute substitute for Mark Wright, who had broken his nose in a collision with his own goalkeeper, Alistair Sperring, but was unable to prevent Southampton going out 2–1 to Rotherham United. He spent a few weeks on loan with Blackburn Rovers in March 1984, without making any first-team appearances, before joining Aldershot on 3 August 1984 for a fee of £10,000.

Aldershot
He made 98 appearances and scored 35 goals in the league for Aldershot, as the "Shots" posted mid-table finishes in the Fourth Division in 1984–85 under Ron Harris. Foyle was named as Aldershot Town Player of the Season for the 1984–85 campaign. Harris was replaced by Len Walker for the 1985–86 campaign, and another mid-table finish ensued. The club won promotion in 1986–87 after beating Wolverhampton Wanderers 3–0 in the play-off Final. However Foyle missed out on the celebrations, as he was transferred to Oxford United on 26 March 1987 for a fee of £140,000, of which Southampton received £40,000.

Oxford United
He featured for Oxford in the First Division during two seasons and scored 44 goals in 151 appearances for the club. The club avoided a relegation play-off in 1986–87 by two points, before a last place finish in 1987–88, after which manager Maurice Evans was replaced by Mark Lawrenson. Lawrenson resigned in October 1988, and was replaced by Brian Horton; Oxford then posted mid-table finishes in the Second Division in 1988–89, 1989–90, and 1990–91.

Port Vale
He signed for Port Vale on 25 June 1991 for a club record fee of £375,000. His first game was against former club Oxford at Vale Park, and he scored both goals in a 2–1 win. Although he finished as leading scorer in the 1991–92 campaign with 16 goals, the club finished bottom of the Second Division that season and were relegated.

During the following season Foyle was part of the team which won the Football League Trophy and narrowly missed out on automatic promotion before losing the play-off final against West Bromwich Albion. He opened the home campaign of the 1993–94 season with a hat-trick in a 6–0 win over Barnet, scoring a left-footed, right-footed and headed goal. He ended the season with 18 goals, Foyle was again the club's leading scorer as the club finally achieved promotion in 1994. One of his 20 goals in the 1994–95 season was the winner in Vale's 1–0 victory in the Potteries derby at the Victoria Ground in 1995, and later he was voted as the club's player of the year for 1995. He played in the 1996 Anglo-Italian Cup Final, scoring twice as Vale lost 5–2 to Genoa. In 1998–99 the ageing striker became the club's top scorer for a fourth time, with nine goals.

During his time at Port Vale, Foyle scored 108 goals, which made him the club's record post-war goalscorer until Tom Pope overtook this tally in 2020. Some of his important goals include a late equaliser in a League Cup tie at Liverpool in 1991, two at Brighton which sealed promotion in 1994, and one in a game at Huddersfield Town in 1998 which saved the club from relegation. In May 2019, he was voted into the "Ultimate Port Vale XI" by members of the OneValeFan supporter website.

Coaching and management career

Port Vale
Persistent knee injuries forced him to retire from football at the age of 36 in 2000, but he stayed at the club as manager of the youth team. Foyle took over first team responsibilities at the club on 13 February 2004 after Brian Horton left by mutual consent, and the team narrowly missed out on a play-off place on goal difference at the end of the 2003–04 season. Following the end of the season, Foyle aimed to keep players at the club, but eventually lost top scorer Stephen McPhee and midfielder Marc Bridge-Wilkinson. The club also had to make massive cut backs due to having just come out of administration and when Steve Brooker (a player signed by Horton on Foyle's recommendation) was sold to Bristol City any chance of a play-off push was unlikely. Vale eventually finished 17th in a frustrating season where many players suffered injuries leaving the squad threadbare on more than one occasion. The next two seasons saw an increase in the playing budget as Vale got their house in order after administration and Foyle steered the side to 13th and 12th-place finishes in League One. Two cup runs to the 4th round of the FA Cup in 2005–06 and 4th round of the League Cup in 2006–07, coupled with the selling of players such as Chris Birchall and Billy Paynter saw the club make a profit on the financial front. He also signed striker Akpo Sodje from Darlington, who would be sold on to Sheffield Wednesday for a reported £300,000 a year later. Showing a talent for signing attackers, he bought striker Leon Constantine for £20,000 from Torquay United, who would hit 26 goals in the 2006–07 season; attacking midfielder Danny Whitaker from Macclesfield Town, who would have a long and successful career; and winger Jeff Smith, who impressed enough to win a £60,000 transfer to Carlisle United.

Despite the improvements, the standard of football on offer was becoming a concern to some, with losses to League Two Hereford United in the FA Cup and at eventually relegated Chesterfield singled out in particular for criticism. Foyle did enough to stave off the critics at the end of the 2006–07 season with a some improved performances which saw the side finish in the top half. With a positive pre-season, which included beating a young Manchester United team and some exciting prospects signing things appeared to be looking up, with chairman Bill Bratt claiming that the club's ambition would be challenging for play-off places. However, the team had a poor start to the 2007–08 campaign claiming just five points from their first seven games and scoring just three goals and also losing in the League Cup to League Two Wrexham. Foyle's tenure as Port Vale manager came to an end on 26 September 2007, as he left the club by mutual consent.

Wrexham
He revealed his interest in taking the vacant managerial position at Lincoln City in October, but he eventually joined Wrexham in January 2008 as first team coach to manager Brian Little and signed a new two-year contract with the club in May. He and Brian Carey took over as joint-caretaker managers on 27 September 2008 after Little left the club during their first season in the Conference Premier, while Foyle was placed as the bookmaker's favourites to succeed Little. They were in control for the 1–1 draw against Torquay United, although Foyle left the club after Dean Saunders was appointed as manager on 2 October 2008.

York City

Foyle was appointed as manager of Conference Premier side York City on 24 November 2008, following the club's sacking of Colin Walker. Foyle's first game in charge finished in a 1–1 draw at his home town club, Salisbury City, who were managed by his former Southampton teammate Nick Holmes. He said he was pleased with how the players reacted to his ideas following the match, although he branded some of the team as "weak-hearted" following a 2–1 defeat to Altrincham in December. He managed York to the 2009 FA Trophy Final at Wembley Stadium on 9 May 2009, which was lost 2–0 to Stevenage Borough.

Foyle won the Conference Manager of the Month award for November after York won four league games and progressed to the FA Cup third round. After York finished the 2009–10 season in fifth place, he guided the team to the 2010 Conference Premier play-off Final at Wembley, where they were beaten 3–1 by Oxford. He resigned on 24 September with York 15th in the table, 10 games into the 2010–11 season. Following this, his assistant manager at York, Andy Porter, commented Foyle had been "sending his CV off everywhere" and was interviewed for the position of manager at League Two side Hereford United, being placed on a shortlist of seven. He was placed on a four-man shortlist for the Mansfield Town managerial vacancy in December.

Bristol Rovers
Foyle was appointed first team coach at League One club Bristol Rovers on 21 January 2011, although he left the club on 7 March following the sacking of manager Dave Penney. After being interviewed twice for the managerial vacancy at Conference club Newport County in March he failed to make a shortlist of three for the job.

Northwich Victoria
Foyle was appointed manager of Northern Premier League Premier Division side Northwich Victoria on a contract until the end of the 2011–12 season on 27 February 2012. His team finished as the division's runners-up, but were in fact relegated after a hearing found that the club had broken financial rules. Foyle had played no part in the financial irregularities, as it was a matter relating to the club's creditors. He stepped down as manager to make way for Alan Wright on 9 May 2012.

Hereford United
Foyle was appointed manager of newly relegated Conference club Hereford United on 30 May 2012. He appointed Andy Porter as his assistant. His first signings were defender Luke Graham and goalkeeper James Bittner on free transfers from Forest Green Rovers. Three further free transfers arrived in defenders Andy Gallinagh and Chris Carruthers, and attacker Marlon Jackson. He further added wingers Marley Watkins and Ryan Bowman to bring his squad to 18 players. More youngsters arrived in the form of loanee Tom Nichols and former Birmingham City youth team midfielder Ashley Sammons.

Going into the season, he further bolstered the squad's links to Forest Green by bringing in striker Phil Marsh and defender Chris Todd on loan. The "Bulls" began the season in impressive form defensively, but soon became afflicted with injuries to numerous members of the small squad. Financial problems became acute, as player's wage payments were missed. Despite this, Foyle masterminded a 3–1 FA Cup giant-killing over nearby League Two side Shrewsbury Town. Hereford finished in sixth place in the league, ten points outside the play-off places.

Hereford struggled in the 2013–14 season, and off the pitch faced a serious financial crisis which meant that Foyle admitted the entire playing staff would have to leave the club in the summer of 2014. Despite this, he won the Conference Manager of the Month award for January 2014 after Hereford went four games unbeaten amidst their growing financial crisis. Foyle parted company with Hereford on 19 March 2014, with the club in 18th place, four points above the relegation zone.

Following continuing non-payment of money owed to him by the club, Foyle issued a winding-up petition against Hereford United Football Club (1939) Ltd.

Southport
He returned to management by joining Conference Premier side Southport on 4 May 2014, following the departure of John Coleman. Two months later he began coaching the under-15 side at the Port Vale Academy. With Southport sitting in the Conference Premier relegation zone following a 5–2 defeat to Woking at Haig Avenue, he left the club by mutual consent on 5 October 2014.

Head of Recruitment
Foyle was named as Head of Recruitment at Northampton Town in February 2015. He went on to work as chief scout at Scottish Premiership club Motherwell the following year. Speaking in September 2019, "Well" scout Martyn Corrigan credited Foyle with bringing a high calibre of players to Fir Park, calling him a "workaholic" with an encyclopedic knowledge of the English football's lower leagues. He returned to Northampton Town in his former role as Head of Recruitment in May 2021. He left Northampton Town in November 2021 to become Morecambe's Head of Recruitment. He left the role six months later. He joined Scottish Premiership side St Mirren as Head of Recruitment in June 2022.

Personal life
Foyle married Jacqueline Churchill in Salisbury in 1985.

Career statistics

Playing statistics
Source:

A.  The "Other" column constitutes appearances and goals in the League Cup, Football League Trophy, Football League play-offs and Full Members Cup.
B.  Statistics for IFK Munkfors not included.

Managerial statistics

Honours

As a player
Port Vale
Football League Trophy: 1992–93

Individual
Aldershot Town F.C. Player of the Season: 1984–85
Port Vale Player of the Year: 1995, 1999
Conference Premier Manager of the Month: January 2014

References

External links

1963 births
Living people
Sportspeople from Salisbury
Footballers from Wiltshire
English footballers
English expatriate footballers
Association football forwards
Southampton F.C. players
Blackburn Rovers F.C. players
Aldershot F.C. players
Oxford United F.C. players
Port Vale F.C. players
English Football League players
Expatriate footballers in Sweden
English expatriate sportspeople in Sweden
English football managers
Port Vale F.C. managers
Wrexham A.F.C. managers
York City F.C. managers
Northwich Victoria F.C. managers
Hereford United F.C. managers
Southport F.C. managers
English Football League managers
National League (English football) managers
Northern Premier League managers
Association football coaches
Association football scouts
Port Vale F.C. non-playing staff
Northampton Town F.C. non-playing staff
Motherwell F.C. non-playing staff
Morecambe F.C. non-playing staff
St Mirren F.C. non-playing staff